was a village located in Nishikunisaki District, Ōita Prefecture, Japan.

As of 2003, the village had an estimated population of 1,829 and the density of 39.70 persons per km2. The total area was 46.07 km2.

On October 1, 2005, Ōta, along with the town of Yamaga (from Hayami District), was merged into the expanded city of Kitsuki.

Dissolved municipalities of Ōita Prefecture